N. alba  may refer to:
 Nepenthes alba, a tropical pitcher plant species endemic to Peninsular Malaysia
 Nymphaea alba, the European white waterlily, white lotus or nenuphar, a freshwater aquatic flowering plant species found all over Europe and in parts of North Africa and the Middle East

See also
 Alba (disambiguation)